Khalil Khorshid (born 10 June 1988) is an Iranian cyclist, who currently rides for UCI Continental team .

Major results

2014
 7th Overall Tour de Filipinas
2015
 9th Overall Tour of Iran (Azerbaijan)
2017
 1st  Overall Tour de Singkarak
1st  Mountains classification
1st Stage 8
2018
 4th Road race, National Road Championships

References

External links

1988 births
Living people
Iranian male cyclists
Sportspeople from Tabriz
21st-century Iranian people